"Il mio amico" is a song by Italian singer Anna Tatangelo. It was released on 29 February 2008 by Sony Music.

The song competed at the Sanremo Music Festival 2008 and ranked second at the end of the competition.

Track listing

Charts

References

2008 songs
2008 singles
Sanremo Music Festival songs
LGBT-related songs